This is a list Grand Slam tennis champions during the Open Era, organized by country. First career wins and highest total counts are boldfaced, and first wins per category are listed in parentheses. The gold-highlighted years with symbol ☆ denote Career Grand Slam achievement years. When the whole box is highlighted yellow, it denotes a "Career Boxed Set". The † sign indicates additional Grand Slam titles achieved before the Open Era.

Grand Slam titles by country

Argentina

Australia

Austria

Bahamas

Belarus

Belgium

Brazil

Bulgaria

Canada

China

Colombia

Croatia (1992–present)

Czech Republic (1993–present)

Czechoslovakia (1945–1992)

Denmark

Ecuador

El Salvador

Finland

France

Germany

Hungary

India

Israel

Italy

Japan

Kazakhstan (1992–present)

Latvia (1992–present)

Mexico

Netherlands

New Zealand

Peru

Poland

Romania

Russia (1992–present)

Serbia (2007–present)

Serbia and Montenegro (1992–2006)
 Federal Republic of Yugoslavia (28 April 1992 – 3 February 2003)
 Serbia and Montenegro (4 February 2003 – 3 June 2006)

Slovakia (1993–present)

Slovenia (1992–present)

South Africa

Soviet Union (1922–1991)

Spain

Sweden

Switzerland

Taiwan

Ukraine (1992–present)

United Kingdom

United States

Uruguay

Yugoslavia (1945–1991)

Zimbabwe

Totals by country

Notes

See also 
 List of Grand Slam singles champions by country

Open Era